Hadım Ali Pasha (also known as Sofu Ali Pasha or Sufi Ali Pasha; died September 1560) was an Ottoman statesman who served as the Ottoman governor of Diyarbekir Eyalet (1537/38 – 1540/41), Bosnia Eyalet (1552 to April 1559), and Egypt Eyalet (April 1559 until his death in office in September 1560). 

In 1560, Ali Pasha blocked the reappointment of Seydi Ali Reis to the rank of admiral after his long journey back from Aceh, which was being pushed by Rüstem Pasha. Instead, Sefer Reis was promoted to the supreme command of the Ottoman Empire's entire Indian Ocean fleet.

Ali Pasha died in September 1560 while still in office as the governor of Egypt. He was buried in the Cairo Necropolis in Cairo. After his death, Ali Pasha's vakıf (legacy endowment) had Ali Pasha's Mosque built in Sarajevo (from which he had governed the Bosnia Eyalet) in the classical Istanbul architectural style.

See also
 List of Ottoman governors of Egypt
 List of Ottoman governors of Bosnia

References

1560 deaths
16th-century Ottoman governors of Egypt
Ottoman governors of Egypt
Ottoman governors of Bosnia
Pashas
Eunuchs from the Ottoman Empire
Year of birth unknown